The mountains of Kosovo belong to Dinarides range.

The mountains make some unusual landscapes like the Rugova Canyon and the Kaçanik Gorge. There are alpine and glacier lakes located in most of the mountains.

List of highest peaks in Kosovo 

The peak marked with an asterisk is the tripoint of Albania, Kosovo and Montenegro.
The peak marked with two asterisks is on the border of Kosovo, Montenegro and Serbia.
The peak marked with three asterisks is the tripoint of Albania, Kosovo and Macedonia.

List of coordinates of some significant mountain peaks 

The list contains coordinates of some significant peaks alphabetically ordered by mountain and then peak name

Border Peaks 
Here are some of the less significant peaks, but that define the border of Kosovo and are thus interesting.

North East on the border to Serbia :
 Babina Stena 
 Lipovicë 
 Grab (peak) 
 Veliki Bukovik 
 Baljevac (mountain)/Valjevac  
 Obrž  
 Srednji Breg 
 Milanov Vrh  next to Pančićev vrh

Following the Tip on the left side :
 Vojetin/Vogetin 
 Vrletnica 
 Strana (peak) 
 Čukara 
 Veliki Deo

References 

  Mountains list in Serbian. (Adopted with author's permission. Used for coordinates only.)
 Greater Geographical Atlas of Yugoslavia, University Press "Liber", Zagreb, 1987.
 USAID/BHR/OFDA "Humanitarian Response Planning Map: Kosovo 1998", Scale 1:225.000, 18 November 1998, 2nd edition

See also 
 Geography of Kosovo
 List of lakes in Kosovo

Mountains in Kosovo
 
Mountains